Kirtlebridge railway station was a station which served the rural area around Kirtlebridge and Eaglesfield, north of Annan in Dumfriesshire, Scotland; the location is now within the area of Dumfries and Galloway unitary council.

The station was served by local trains on the Caledonian Railway main line between Carlisle and Glasgow, now the West Coast Main Line, and the station was the junction for the Solway Junction Railway. The nearest station for Kirtlebridge is now at Lockerbie.

History 
Opened by the Caledonian Railway, it became part of the London Midland and Scottish Railway following the Grouping of 1923 and was then closed by British Railways in 1960. The station was the junction for the Solway Junction Railway, which connected the mineral districts of Cumberland and Westmoreland to the Caledonian line.

The station had a number of sidings, a goods shed, turntable, signal box, a bay platform and an interchange with the main line. A narrow gauge mineral line ran over the main line to serve local quarries and the old bridge survives as part of a narrow access lane.

Passenger services on the Solway line as far as Annan were withdrawn on 27 April 1931, the line south of Annan over the Solway Viaduct having already closed completely. Goods services were withdrawn on 28 February 1955.

Accident
A rail crash that took place on 2 October 1872 when a night express passenger train from London ran at 40 mph into a shunting goods train. Eleven passengers and one engineman were killed.

Location

The site today 
Trains pass at speed on the electrified West Coast Main Line. The station has been demolished and the M74 runs over part of the old station site. The Station Hotel stood nearby, but it has also been demolished.

References

Notes

Sources

External links
 Rail Brit

Disused railway stations in Dumfries and Galloway
Railway stations in Great Britain opened in 1847
Railway stations in Great Britain closed in 1960
Former Caledonian Railway stations
1847 establishments in Scotland